Server is both a Turkish origin masculine given name and surname. Notable people with the name include:

Surname
Eric Server (born 1944), American television actor
Greg Server (born 1939), American politician
Josh Server (born 1979), American actor

Given name
Server Djeparov (born 1982), Uzbekistani football player
Server Tanilli (1931–2011), Turkish academic and author

Turkish masculine given names